Carl Axel Thomas Nordegren (born 20 February 1953) is a Swedish journalist and writer.

Nordegren was born in Helsingborg. He has worked as a foreign correspondent for Swedish National Radio in Helsinki, Brussels, and later in Berlin (1997–2001) and Washington, D.C. (2003–2007). He has been a visiting professor at New York University. Currently, he has a radio talk show, together with Louise Epstein, called Nordegren och Epstein i P1. Previously he had his own show Nordegren i P1. Nordegren is the father of Elin Nordegren and former father-in-law of golfer Tiger Woods.

References 

1953 births
Living people
People from Helsingborg
New York University faculty
Swedish journalists
Swedish-language writers